Harun ibn Khumarawayh (died 30 December 904) was the fourth Tulunid Emir of Egypt (896–904). He succeeded his elder brother Abu 'l-Asakir Jaysh, who had been murdered by army chiefs. He left state affairs to the vizier, Abu Ja'far ibn Ali, preferring to live a life of dissolute luxury. This led to a growing crisis in the country, since state finances could not be regulated and the army leaders gradually accrued more power to themselves

The Abbasid Caliphate took advantage of this state of affairs and invaded Tulunid-controlled Syria in 904. The Tulunid troops deserted, and the forces of the Caliphate were able to enter the Nile valley. Harun was killed in an army mutiny. His successor was the last of the Tulunids, his uncle Shayban (904–905).

9th-century births
904 deaths
9th-century Tulunid emirs
10th-century Tulunid emirs
Tulunid emirs
Year of birth unknown